Svenska Cupen 2009 was the 54th season of the main Swedish football Cup. AIK beat IFK Göteborg in the final 2-0 to lift the cup, thereby completing a league and cup double for the 2009 season. The competition started on 14 March 2009 and concluded with the final on November 7, 2009.

Preliminary round
50 teams from the third level or lower of the Swedish league pyramid competed in this round.

!colspan="3"|14 March 2009

|-
!colspan="3"|21 March 2009

|-
!colspan="3"|22 March 2009

|}

Round 1
Twelve lower league teams, three teams which earned promotion to Superettan 2009 and the bottom eight teams from Superettan 2008 entered in this round. They were joined by 25 preliminary round winners.

!colspan="3"|25 March 2009

|-
!colspan="3"|28 March 2009

|-
!colspan="3"|29 March 2009

|-
!colspan="3"|30 March 2009

|-
!colspan="3"|2 April 2009

|-
!colspan="3"|3 April 2009

|-
!colspan="3"|4 April 2009

|}

Round 2
Three demoted teams from Allsvenskan 2008 and five teams ranked 4th through 8th in Superettan 2008 entered in this round, where they were joined by 24 winners from Round 1.

!colspan="3"|8 April 2009

|-
!colspan="3"|9 April 2009

|}

Round 3
Sixteen teams from Allsvenskan 2009 will enter in this round. They will be joined by the 16 winners of Round 2.

!colspan="3"|25 April 2009

|-
!colspan="3"|26 April 2009

|}

Round 4
The sixteen winning teams from round 3. 

!colspan="3"|13 May 2009

|-
!colspan="3"|14 May 2009

|}

Quarter-finals

Semi-finals

Final

External links
 Official site 

2009
Cupen
2009 domestic association football cups